Fayzabad (also spelled Feyzabad or Faizabad) is a city in northeastern Afghanistan, with a population of around 39,555 people. It serves as the provincial capital and largest city of Badakhshan Province.

Fayzabad is the main commercial and administrative center of the Pamir region. The Kokcha River runs alongside the city. The Fayzabad Airport is located next to the city, which provides limited domestic flight services.

History

The city was called Jauz Gun until 1680 because of the many walnut ("jauz") farms in the area. The name was changed to Faizabad, which can be roughly translated as "abode of divine bounty, blessing, and charity", when the robe of Prophet Muhammed was delivered to the city. Tradition states that it was brought here by Muhammad Shaykh Ziya and Shaykh Niyaz after Wais Quran brought it to Balkh.

At that time the city replaced Munjan as the capital of Badakhshan. Later, in 1768, Ahmad Durrani took the robe to Kandahar, and established the Mosque of the Cloak of the Prophet Mohammed there in 1695 (A.D.). The Sáhibzádas of Samarkand removed the relic of the prophet from the capital in 1734 (A.D.). His clothing which came from the Turkish Campaign was taken by Temorlane to Samarkand. Whilst the relic was being conveyed to India it was captured by Mír Yár Beg who deposited it at Fayzabad.

In 1821 the city was destroyed by Mohammad Murad Beg, and the inhabitants removed to Kunduz. But after it was annexed by Abdur Rahman Khan, the town recovered its former importance, and became a considerable place of trade.

Many visitors used to come to a shrine erected in the city. The Khoja community of Badakhshán were made attendants at the shrine.

There are seven historical forts in and around the city, several of which are in ruins. These forts were built to help defend the city or the roads leading in and out.

In 1979 the town became a hotbed of guerrilla groups as Afghans sought to repel the Soviet invasion. Fayzabad was taken by Soviet forces in 1980 and became a base for the Soviet garrison.

Many NGOs who work in the Badakhshan province have placed their headquarters in the new part of the city. Near the city Germany is leading the Provincial Reconstruction Team. Danish and Czech teams had been a part of the PRT but the Czechs left in 2007 and the Danes in 2008. The camp is based on an old Soviet airstrip.

On 11 August 2021, the city was captured by the Taliban amid a rapid advance of the group in the north after they launched a massive offensive.

Geography

The city is located on the right bank of the Kokcha River near where the river exits from a gorge and before it reaches a large open plain.

Climate
Fayzabad has a humid continental climate (Köppen climate classification Dsb). It has warm, dry summers and cold, moderately wet winters. Precipitation mostly falls in spring and winter.

Economy

Fayzabad has historically been relatively isolated from other parts of the country because of the lack of paved roads. There are two active bazaars in the city where items as diverse as cotton, cotton cloth and goods, salt, sugar, tea, indigo, and cutlery are traded. It has been two years since the asphalted ring road of Afghanistan reached Fayzabad. The cost of the road connecting Fayzabad with Taloqan and Kunduz was about $US 200 million which was paid for by USAID.

Several varieties of cash crops are grown in the vicinity including barley, wheat, and rice and there are a number of gardens and orchards. There has been some success in panning for gold in the vicinity, beryl can be found and there is a salt mine located nearby. The city also has a handicraft industry producing woolen goods and there are flour and rice mills. The Shurabak power station, which is located on the outskirts of Fayzabad, provides 7.5 megawatts (MW) of electricity to the city.

Demographics and culture

Fayzabad was reported to have 39,555 residents in 2021. The majority of the inhabitants are Tajiks, while there are also minority communities of Pashtuns, Pamiris, Uzbeks, Hazaras and Turkmens.

Eleven languages are spoken in the city, including Dari, Wakhi, Munji, Pashto, Ishkashimi, Yazgulyam, Sarikoli, Shughni, Rushani, Uzbek and Turkmen.

There are a number of mosques and shrines of historical importance in the city.

Education 

Badakhshan University is located in Fayzabad. The city has several public schools including an all-girls school.

Public services 
There is a government-run hospital in the province. There are a number of private guesthouses in the city, Qasre Kokcha Hotel is the best among them which has security, central heating system, electricity and internet. There is also a guest house called Lapis Lazuli for expatriates.

See also
 2002 Hindu Kush earthquakes

References

External links

  (AF Journal)
  (Nature & Culture)

Populated places in Fayzabad District
Provincial capitals in Afghanistan